ADCOP may refer to:

 Asymmetric distributed constraint optimization
 Abu Dhabi Crude Oil Pipeline - also called Habshan–Fujairah oil pipeline.